Snapalysin (small neutral protease, SnpA gene product (Streptomyces lividans)) is an enzyme. This enzyme catalyses the following chemical reaction

 Hydrolyses proteins with a preference for Tyr or Phe in the P1' position. Has no action on amino-acid p-nitroanilides

This enzyme belongs to the peptidase family M7.

References

External links 
 

EC 3.4.24